Doorway worship refers to a ritual of worship at the entrance of a home, company, or institution, where various types of Ghosts and Gods can be, it is prominent in East Asian culture. It can involve giving offerings such as wine, or Soft drinks. It is a prominent element of Taiwanese folk beliefs.

It can also be a festival where incense is set up at the entrance to worship the spirits passing through the area during the local welcome tournament or Miaohui.

Among the daily rituals of Taiwanese folk beliefs, "doorway worship" is very common, and varies considerably by ethnic group. Minnan people often perform door worship for Tudigong, the foundation owner, and Goryō, while Hakka people also worship Goryō, but not all Goryō, but Goryō who have passed away in this community and have no descendants to worship them.

See also

 Yin miao

References

East Asian folk sacrificial activities
Goryō faith